In Exile is a 1998 UK Channel 4 television sitcom about a deposed African military dictator, played by Patrice Naiambana, in exile in Britain. The series was created by Nigerian screenwriter Tunde Babalola. The series ran for 7 episodes.

Cast
Patrice Naiambana as General Mukata
Fraser James as Solomon, chauffeur to General Mukate
Emily Joyce as Ellen
Owen Brenman as Mr Bishop 
Jeillo Edwards
Philip Whitchurch
Robbie Gee as Bobo

References

Channel 4 sitcoms